is a former Japanese football player.

Playing career
Kubo was born in Ibaraki Prefecture on August 21, 1973. After graduating from high school, he joined Nagoya Grampus Eight in 1992. He could not play at all in the match in his first 2 seasons. On November 9, 1994, he debuted as defender against Yokohama Marinos. However he could only play this match and retired end of 1995 season.

Club statistics

References

External links

1973 births
Living people
Association football people from Ibaraki Prefecture
Japanese footballers
J1 League players
Nagoya Grampus players
Association football defenders